2018 Toronto attack may refer to:

Toronto van attack, a vehicle-ramming attack that occurred on April 23.
2018 Toronto shooting, a mass shooting that occurred on July 22.